is a manga written by Maguro Fujita. A 30-episode anime series based on the manga was produced by NAS and TV Tokyo and animated by Studio Comet.

Plot
Aoi, a normal school boy, is cursed by a wizard named Makaeru from the Land of Frogs, who tells him that if he wants to remove the curse he is to find Mimori, who is later discovered to be the sister of Makaeru. The curse causes Aoi to transform into a frog whenever he is wet, changing back into a human when he dries off. Makaeru then casts Aoi into the Land of Frogs, where he meets Mimori, the princess of the land. Aoi asks if she knew about the curse. However, Mimori remembers her brother's saying as he handed her the Book of Magic before he disappeared: "This book enables the frog people like us to use magic. If you find that there are some pages missing, then it is your duty to find it."

Aoi then realizes that his quest is to find the missing pages of the Book of Magic, hoping that the pages will contain the cure for the curse.

Characters

Princess Mimori
Mimori is the main female character in the series. She is 14 years old and also the princess of the frog clan that is always happy and cheerful. It is known that Mimori has feelings for Aoi but has not realized it to her denseness.
Aoi
A 14 year old normal boy from the real world. He has the ability to change to a frog when he gets wet by the curse of Mimori's older brother, Makaeru. Also, Aoi has feelings for Mimori.
Suu 
A 14 year old girl and princess of snake clan. She is a supporting character and she's jealous of Mimori.

Snake Clan

The land of Frogs and the land of Snakes (the two different species) had been in war, as explained in the first section of episode 1. Mimori's parents had been absorbed into a tunnel, while engaged in the battle, and left only Makaeru and Mimori to govern the kingdom.

There were a minor number of survivors from the snake clan, but Mimori soon discovers a rival: Suu, the princess from the Land of Snakes, who had survived the war, and whose parents were also absorbed. This princess begins an interest to Aoi, and is jealous of Mimori, at which she finds a sailor (whose true identity is a woman) and falls in love with her.

Episodes

Season 1

Season 2

References

External links
Kero Kero Chime review at T.H.E.M. Anime Reviews
 

1995 manga
1997 anime television series debuts
Japanese children's animated comedy television series
Japanese children's animated fantasy television series
Japanese television series with live action and animation
Anime series based on manga
Fantasy anime and manga
Television series about shapeshifting
Shōjo manga
Shueisha franchises
TV Tokyo original programming